Flight 511 may refer to:

ČSA Flight 511 (March 1961), crashed on 28 March 1961
ČSA Flight 511 (July 1961), crashed on 12 July 1961

0511